Poliki is an Indian Village located in Anantapur district of Andhra Pradesh, India.

Geography
Poliki is a village in Vidapanakal Mandal in Anantapur District of Andhra Pradesh State, India. It belongs to Rayalaseema region.

References

Villages in Anantapur district